Kim Jung-joo (Hangul: 김정주, Hanja: 金貞柱; born November 11, 1981 in Jinju, Gyeongsangnam-do, South Korea) is a South Korean amateur boxer who won welterweight bronze medals at the 2004 Summer Olympics and 2008 Summer Olympics.

Kim received a Master's degree in physical education from Sangji University in South Korea.

Career
He won a gold medal in welterweight at the 2002 Asian Games, beating Non Boonjumnong in the semifinals. Kim qualified for the Athens Games by winning the gold medal at the 2004 Asian Amateur Boxing Championships in Puerto Princesa, Philippines. In the final he defeated Uzbekistan's Sherzod Husanov.

He did not compete at the 2005 and 2007 world championships and was beaten in the first round at the 2006 Asian Games by Angkhan Chomphuphuang. He easily qualified for the 2008 Summer Olympics, though, by beating Davran Khabirov and Dilshod Mahmudov.

Results 
2003 World Championships

2004 Summer Olympics

2008 Summer Olympics

External links
 Buijing 2008 Olympic Games 
 Asian Games 2002

1981 births
Living people
Olympic boxers of South Korea
Boxers at the 2004 Summer Olympics
Boxers at the 2008 Summer Olympics
Olympic bronze medalists for South Korea
Olympic medalists in boxing
Asian Games medalists in boxing
Boxers at the 2002 Asian Games
Boxers at the 2006 Asian Games
Medalists at the 2008 Summer Olympics
South Korean male boxers
Medalists at the 2004 Summer Olympics
Asian Games gold medalists for South Korea
Medalists at the 2002 Asian Games
Welterweight boxers
People from Jinju
Sportspeople from South Gyeongsang Province